The International Olympic Committee (IOC; , CIO) is a non-governmental sports organisation based in Lausanne, Switzerland. It is constituted in the form of an association under the Swiss Civil Code (articles 60–79). Founded in 1894 by Pierre de Coubertin and Demetrios Vikelas, it is the authority responsible for organising the modern (Summer, Winter, and Youth) Olympic Games.

The IOC is the governing body of the National Olympic Committees (NOCs) and of the worldwide "Olympic Movement", the IOC's term for all entities and individuals involved in the Olympic Games. As of 2020, there are 206 NOCs officially recognised by the IOC. The current president of the IOC is Thomas Bach.

The stated mission of the IOC is to promote Olympism throughout the world and to lead the Olympic Movement:

To encourage and support the promotion of ethics and good governance in sport as well as education of youth through sport and to dedicate its efforts to ensuring that, in sport, the spirit of fair play prevails and violence is banned;
To encourage and support the organization, development, and coordination of sport and sports competitions;
To ensure the regular celebration of the Olympic Games;
To cooperate with competent public or private organizations and authorities endeavouring to place sport at the service of humanity and thereby to promote peace;
To take action to strengthen the unity of the Olympic Movement, to protect its independence, to maintain and promote its political neutrality and to preserve the autonomy of sport;
To act against any form of discrimination affecting the Olympic Movement;
To encourage and support elected representatives of athletes within the Olympic Movement, with the IOC Athletes’ Commission acting as their supreme representative on all Olympic Games and related matters;
To encourage and support the promotion of women in sport at all levels and in all structures with a view to implementing the principle of equality between men and women;
To protect clean athletes and the integrity of sport, by leading the fight against doping, and by taking action against all forms of manipulation of competitions and related corruption;
To encourage and support measures relating to the medical care and health of athletes;
To oppose any political or commercial abuse of sport and athletes;
To encourage and support the efforts of sports organisations and public authorities to provide for the social and professional future of athletes;
To encourage and support the development of sport for all;
To encourage and support a responsible concern for environmental issues, to promote sustainable development in sport and to require that the Olympic Games are held accordingly;
To promote a positive legacy from the Olympic Games to the host cities, regions and countries;
To encourage and support initiatives blending sport with culture and education;
To encourage and support the activities of the International Olympic Academy (“IOA”) and other institutions which dedicate themselves to Olympic education;
To promote safe sport and the protection of athletes from all forms of harassment and abuse.

Since 1995, the IOC has worked to address environmental health concerns resulting from the hosting of the Olympic games. Since 2002, the IOC has been involved in several high-profile controversies including taking gifts, its DMCA take down request of the 2008 Tibetan protest videos, Russian doping scandals, and its support of the Beijing 2022 Winter Olympics despite China's human rights violations documented in the Xinjiang Papers.

Oath taken by IOC Members 
"Honoured to be chosen as a member of the International Olympic Committee,
I fully accept all the responsibilities that this office brings:
I promise to serve the Olympic Movement to the best of my ability.
I will respect the Olympic Charter and accept the decisions of the IOC.
I will always act independently of commercial and political interests as well as
of any racial or religious consideration.
I will fully comply with the IOC Code of Ethics.
I promise to fight against all forms of discrimination and dedicate myself
in all circumstances to promote the interests of the International Olympic
Committee and Olympic Movement."

History

 
The IOC was created by Pierre de Coubertin, on 23 June 1894 with Demetrios Vikelas as its first president. As of February 2022, its membership consists of 105 active members, 45 honorary members, and one honour member (Henry Kissinger). The IOC is the supreme authority of the worldwide modern Olympic Movement.

The IOC organizes the modern Olympic Games and Youth Olympic Games (YOG), held in summer and winter every four years. The first Summer Olympics was held in Athens, Greece, in 1896; the first Winter Olympics was in Chamonix, France, in 1924. The first Summer YOG was in Singapore in 2010, and the first Winter YOG was in Innsbruck in 2012.

Until 1992, both Summer and Winter Olympics were held in the same year. After that year, however, the IOC shifted the Winter Olympics to the even years between Summer Games to help space the planning of the two events from one another, and to improve the financial balance of the IOC, which receives a proportionally greater income in Olympic years.

In 2009, the UN General Assembly granted the IOC Permanent Observer status. The decision enables the IOC to be directly involved in the UN Agenda and to attend UN General Assembly meetings where it can take the floor. In 1993, the General Assembly approved a Resolution to further solidify IOC–UN cooperation by reviving the Olympic Truce.

The IOC received approval in November 2015 to construct a new headquarters in Vidy, Lausanne. The cost of the project was estimated to stand at $156m. The IOC announced on the 11th of February 2019 that the "Olympic House" would be inaugurated on the 23rd of June 2019 to coincide with its 125th anniversary. The Olympic Museum remains in Ouchy, Lausanne.

Organization

IOC Session

The IOC Session is the general meeting of the members of the IOC, held once a year in which each member has one vote. It is the IOC's supreme organ and its decisions are final.

Extraordinary Sessions may be convened by the President or upon the written request of at least one third of the members.

Among others, the powers of the Session are:
To adopt or amend the Olympic Charter.
To elect the members of the IOC, the Honorary President and the honorary members.
To elect the President, the vice-presidents and all other members of the IOC Executive Board.
To elect the host city of the Olympic Games.

Subsidiaries
Olympic Foundation (Lausanne, Switzerland)
IOC Television and Marketing Services S.A. (Lausanne, Switzerland)
The Olympic Partner Programme (Lausanne, Switzerland)
Olympic Broadcasting Services S.A. (Lausanne, Switzerland)
Olympic Broadcasting Services S.L. (Madrid, Spain)
Olympic Channel Services S.A. (Lausanne, Switzerland)
Olympic Channel Services S.L. (Madrid, Spain)
Olympic Foundation for Culture and Heritage (Lausanne, Switzerland)
IOC Heritage Management
Olympic Studies Centre
Olympic Museum
International Programmes for Arts, Culture and Education
Olympic Solidarity (Lausanne, Switzerland)

IOC members

For most of its existence the IOC was controlled by members who were selected by other members. Countries that had hosted the Games were allowed two members. When named they did not become the representatives of their respective countries to the IOC, but rather the opposite, IOC members in their respective countries.

Cessation of membership
The membership of IOC members ceases in the following circumstances:

Resignation: any IOC member may cease their membership at any time by delivering a written resignation to the President.
Non re-election: any IOC member ceases to be a member without further formality if they are not re-elected.
Age limit: any IOC member ceases to be a member at the end of the calendar year during which they reach the age of 70 or 80. Any member who joined in the 1900s ceases to be a member at age 80 and any member who joined in the 2000s ceases to be a member at age 70.
Failure to attend Sessions or take active part in IOC work for two consecutive years.
Transfer of domicile or of main centre of interests to a country other than the country which was theirs at the time of their election.
Members elected as active athletes cease to be a member upon ceasing to be a member of the IOC Athletes' Commission.
Presidents and individuals holding an executive or senior leadership position within NOCs, world or continental associations of NOCs, IFs or associations of IFs, or other organisations recognised by the IOC cease to be a member upon ceasing to exercise the function they were exercising at the time of their election.
Expulsion: an IOC member may be expelled by decision of the Session if such member has betrayed their oath or if the Session considers that such member has neglected or knowingly jeopardised the interests of the IOC or acted in a way which is unworthy of the IOC.

Sports federations recognised by IOC
There are currently 82 international sports federations (IFs) recognised by the IOC. These are:
The 33 members of Association of Summer Olympic International Federations (ASOIF)
The 7 members of Association of International Olympic Winter Sports Federations (AIOWF)
The 42 members of Association of IOC Recognised International Sports Federations (ARISF)

Honours
In addition to the Olympic medals for competitors, the IOC awards a number of other honours.
The Pierre de Coubertin medal is awarded to athletes who demonstrate a special spirit of sportsmanship in Olympic events
The Olympic Cup is awarded to institutions or associations with a record of merit and integrity in actively developing the Olympic Movement
The Olympic Order is awarded to individuals for exceptionally distinguished contributions to the Olympic Movement; superseded the Olympic Certificate
The Olympic Laurel is awarded to individuals for promoting education, culture, development, and peace through sport
The Olympic town status has been given to some towns that have been particularly important for the Olympic Movement

Olympic marketing

During the first half of the 20th century the IOC ran on a small budget. As president of the IOC from 1952 to 1972, Avery Brundage rejected all attempts to link the Olympics with commercial interest. Brundage believed the lobby of corporate interests would unduly impact the IOC's decision-making. Brundage's resistance to this revenue stream meant the IOC left organising committees to negotiate their own sponsorship contracts and use the Olympic symbols.

When Brundage retired the IOC had US$2 million in assets; eight years later the IOC coffers had swelled to US$45 million. This was primarily due to a shift in ideology toward expansion of the Games through corporate sponsorship and the sale of television rights. When Juan Antonio Samaranch was elected IOC president in 1980 his desire was to make the IOC financially independent. Samaranch appointed Canadian IOC member Richard Pound to lead the initiative as Chairman of the "New Sources of Finance Commission".

In 1982 the IOC drafted International Sport and Leisure, a Swiss sports marketing company, to develop a global marketing programme for the Olympic Movement. ISL successfully developed the programme but was replaced by Meridian Management, a company partly owned by the IOC in the early 1990s. In 1989, one of the staff members at ISL Marketing, Michael Payne, moved to the IOC and became the organisation's first marketing director. ISL and then Meridian, continued in the established role as the IOC's sales and marketing agents until 2002. In collaboration with ISL Marketing and Meridian Management, Payne made major contributions to the creation of a multibillion-dollar sponsorship marketing programme for the organisation which, along with improvements in TV marketing and improved financial management, helped to restore the IOC's financial viability.

Revenue
The Olympic Movement generates revenue through five major programmes.

Broadcast partnerships, managed by the IOC.
Commercial sponsorship, organised through the IOC's worldwide TOP programme.
Domestic sponsorship, managed by the Organising Committees for the Olympic Games (OCOGs).
Ticketing.
Licensing programmes within the host country.

The OCOGs have responsibility for the domestic sponsorship, ticketing and licensing programmes, under the direction of the IOC. The Olympic Movement generated a total of more than US$4 billion (€2.5 billion) in revenue during the Olympic quadrennium from 2001 to 2004.

Revenue distribution
The IOC distributes some of the Olympic marketing revenue to organisations throughout the Olympic Movement to support the staging of the Olympic Games and to promote the worldwide development of sport. The IOC retains approximately 10% of the Olympic marketing revenue for the operational and administrative costs of governing the Olympic Movement. For the 2013-2016 period, the IOC had revenues of about US$5.0 billion, of which 73% were from broadcasting rights and 18% were from The Olympic Partners. The Rio 2016 organising committee received US$1.5 billion and the Sochi 2014 organising committee received 833 million. National Olympic committees and international federations received US$739 million each.

Organizing Committees for the Olympic Games
The IOC provides TOP programme contributions and Olympic broadcast revenue to the OCOGs to support the staging of the Summer Olympic Games and the Winter Olympic Games:
TOP programme revenue to OCOGs: the two OCOGs of each Olympic quadrennium generally share approximately 50% of TOP programme revenue and value-in-kind contributions, with approximately 30% provided to the summer OCOG and 20% provided to the winter OCOG.
Broadcast revenue to OCOGs: the IOC contributes 49% of the Olympic broadcast revenue for each Games to the OCOG. During the 2001–2004 Olympic quadrennium, the Salt Lake 2002 Organizing Committee received US$443 million, €395 million in broadcast revenue from the IOC, and the Athens 2004 Organizing Committee received US$732 million, €690 million.
Domestic programme revenue to OCOGs: the OCOGs generate substantial revenue from the domestic marketing programmes that they manage within the host country, including domestic sponsorship, ticketing and licensing.

National Olympic Committees

The NOCs receive financial support for the training and development of Olympic teams, Olympic athletes and Olympic hopefuls. The IOC distributes TOP programme revenue to each of the NOCs throughout the world. The IOC also contributes Olympic broadcast revenue to Olympic Solidarity, an IOC organisation that provides financial support to NOCs with the greatest need. The continued success of the TOP programme and Olympic broadcast agreements has enabled the IOC to provide increased support for the NOCs with each Olympic quadrennium. The IOC provided approximately US$318.5 million to NOCs for the 2001–2004 quadrennium.

International Olympic Sports Federations
The IOC is the largest single revenue source for the majority of IFs, with its contributions of Olympic broadcast revenue that assist the IFs in the development of their respective sports worldwide. The IOC provides financial support from Olympic broadcast revenue to the 28 IFs of Olympic summer sports and the seven IFs of Olympic winter sports after the completion of the Summer Olympics and the Winter Olympics. The continually increasing value of Olympic broadcast partnership has enabled the IOC to deliver substantially increased financial support to the IFs with each successive Games. The seven winter sports IFs shared US$85.8 million, €75 million in Salt Lake 2002 broadcast revenue. The contribution to the 28 summer sports IFs from Athens 2004 broadcast revenue has not yet been determined, but the contribution is expected to mark a significant increase over the US$190 million, €150 million that the IOC provided to the summer IFs following Sydney 2000.

Other organisations
The IOC contributes Olympic marketing revenue to the programmes of various recognised international sports organisations, including the International Paralympic Committee (IPC), and the World Anti-Doping Agency (WADA).

Environmental concerns
The IOC recognises that the Olympic Games demand substantial environmental resources, activities, and construction projects that could be detrimental to a host city's environment. In 1995, IOC President Juan Antonio Samaranch stated, "the International Olympic Committee is resolved to ensure that the environment becomes the third dimension of the organization of the Olympic Games, the first and second being sport and culture." Acting on this statement, in 1996 the IOC added the "environment" as a third pillar to its vision for the Olympic Games. The IOC requires cities bidding to host the Olympics to provide a comprehensive strategy to protect the environment in preparation for hosting, and following the conclusion of the Games. This initiative was most notably acted upon in 2000, when the "Green Olympics" effort was developed by the Beijing Organizing Committee for the Beijing Olympic Games. The Beijing 2008 Summer Olympics effort to host environmentally friendly games resulted in over 160 projects meeting the goal of "green" games through improved air quality and water quality, implementation of sustainable energy sources, improved waste management, and environmental education. These projects included industrial plant relocation or closure, furnace replacement, introduction of new emission standards, and more strict traffic control. Most of these measures were adopted on a temporary basis, and although real improvements were realized (particularly in air quality), most of these improvements had disappeared one year following the Games. Although these improvements were short lived, IOC's inclusion of environmental policies in evaluating and selecting host cities demonstrates a corporate responsibility that may be built upon in years to come. Detailed frameworks for environmental sustainability have been released for the 2018 Winter Olympics, and 2020 Summer Olympics in PyeongChang, South Korea, and Tokyo, Japan, respectively.

IOC approaches
The IOC has four major approaches to addressing environmental health concerns during the construction and competitions of the Olympic Games. First, the IOC Sustainability and Legacy Commission focuses on how the IOC can improve the strategies and policies associated with environmental health throughout the process of cities hosting the Olympic Games. Secondly, every candidate city must provide information to the IOC on environmental health issues like air quality and environmental impact assessments. Thirdly, every host city is given the option to declare "pledges" to address specific or general environmental health concerns of hosting the Olympic Game. Fourthly, the IOC has every host city collaborate with the United Nations to work towards addressing environmental health objectives. Ultimately, the IOC uses these four approaches in an attempt to minimize the negative environmental health concerns of a host city.

Venue construction effects on air
Cities hosting the Olympic Games have two primary concerns: traffic congestion and air pollution, both of which can result in compromised air quality during and after Olympic venue construction. Research at the Beijing Olympic Games identified particulate matter – measured in terms of PM10 (the amount of aerodynamic diameter of particle≤10 μm in a given amount of air) – as a top priority that should be taken into consideration. The particulate matter in the air, along with other airborne pollutants, cause both serious health problems, such as asthma, and contribute to the deterioration of urban ecosystems. Black Carbon is released into the air from incomplete combustion of carbonaceous fluids contributing to global climate change and human health effects. Additionally, secondary pollutants like CO, NOx, SO2, benzene, toluene, ethylbenzene, and xylenes (BTEX) are also released during the venue construction, resulting in harmful effects to the environment. Measures are taken to measure particulates in the air.

Various air quality improvement measures are undertaken before and after the Olympic Games. Research studies demonstrate that the primary method to reduce concentrations of air pollutants is traffic control, including barring heavy vehicles from the roads. For the Beijing Olympics, vehicles not meeting the Euro 1 emission standards were also banned from the roads, and the odd-even rule was implemented in the Beijing administrative area. Several air quality improvement measures implemented by the Beijing government included replacing coal with natural gas, suspending construction and/or imposing strict dust control on construction sites, closing or relocating the polluting industrial plants, building long subway lines, using cleaner fluid in power plants, and reducing the activity by some of the polluting factories. There, levels of primary and secondary pollutants were reduced, and good air quality was recorded during the Beijing Olympics on most of the days.

Venue construction effects on soil
Soil contamination can occur during the process of constructing the Olympic venues. In the case of the 2006 Winter Olympic Games in Torino, Italy, negative environmental impacts were observed, including impacts on soil. Before the Games, researchers studied four areas which the Games would likely affect: a floodplain, a highway, the motorway connecting the city to Lyon, France, and a landfill. They performed an extensive analysis in the types of chemicals found in the soils in these areas both before and after the Games. Their findings revealed an increase in the number of metals in the topsoil post-Games, and indicated that soil was capable of negating, or "buffering," the effects of many heavy metals. However, their findings also revealed that this was not the case for all metals, and that mercury, lead, and arsenic may have been transferred into the food chain on a massive scale.
One of the promises made to Londoners when they won the right to host the 2012 Olympic Games was that the Olympic Park would be a "blueprint for sustainable living." However, residents of the allotments of Manor Road were relocated, due to the building of the Olympic stadium, and would later disagree that the Olympics had had any positive effect on their lives. Allotments were originally intended to provide low-income residents with a plot of land on which to grow their own food. Many of these sites were lost as a result of the Olympic venue construction, most notably the Manor Road site. Residents were promised that the allotments would be returned, and they eventually were. However, the soil quality would never be the same. Further, allotment residents were exposed to radioactive waste for five months prior to moving, during the excavation of the site for the Games. Other local residents, construction workers, and onsite archaeologists faced similar exposures and risks.
In contrast, the Sydney Olympic Games of 2000 provided an opportunity to improve a highly contaminated area known as the Homebush Bay site. A study commissioned by the New South Wales Government Olympic Coordination Authority, which was responsible for the Games' site preparation, looked at soil contamination prior to the Games. The work assessed soils that had been previously impacted by waste and identified areas that could pose a risk to the environment. Soil metal concentrations were found to be high enough to potentially contaminate groundwater. After risk areas were identified, a remediation strategy was developed. Contaminated soil was consolidated into four containment areas within the site, which left the remaining areas available for recreational use. Also, the contained waste materials no longer posed a threat to surrounding aquifers. Sydney's winning Olympic bid provided a catalyst to undertake the "greenest" single urban remediation ever attempted in Australia.

Venue construction effects on water
The Olympic Games can affect water quality in the surrounding region in several ways, including water runoff and the transfer of polluting substances from the air to water sources through rainfall. Harmful particulates come from both natural substances (such as plant matter crushed by higher volumes of pedestrian and vehicle traffic) and man-made substances (such as exhaust from vehicles or industry). Contaminants from these two categories lead to elevated amounts of toxins in street dust. Street dust reaches water sources through runoff, facilitating the transfer of toxins to environments and communities that rely on these water sources. One method of measuring the runoff contamination of water sources involves magnetism. Magnetism measurement systems allow specialists to measure the differences in mineral magnetic parameters in samples of water, air, and vegetation. Another method used to assess the amount and effects of water pollutants is to measure the amount of PM2.5 in rainfall. Measuring PM2.5 (the amount of aerodynamic diameter of particle≤2.5 μm in a given amount of air) is a common metric for assessing air quality. Comparing PM2.5 levels between air and rainfall samples allows scientists to determine the amount of air pollution being transferred to water sources. In 2013, researchers in Beijing found a significant relationship between the amount of PM2.5 concentrations in the air and in rainfall. Studies showed that rainfall had transferred a portion of these pollutants from the air to water sources.

Controversies

Amateurism and professionalism

Pierre de Coubertin, founder of the IOC, was influenced by the ethos of the aristocracy as exemplified in the English public schools. The public schools subscribed to the belief that sport formed an important part of education and there was a prevailing concept of fairness in which practicing or training was considered cheating. As class structure evolved through the 20th century, the definition of the amateur athlete as an aristocratic gentleman became outdated. The advent of the state-sponsored "full-time amateur athlete" of the Eastern Bloc countries further eroded the ideology of the pure amateur, as it put the self-financed amateurs of the Western countries at a disadvantage. The Soviet Union entered teams of athletes who were all nominally students, soldiers, or working in a profession, but many of whom were in reality paid by the state to train on a full-time basis. Nevertheless, the IOC held to the traditional rules regarding amateurism.

Near the end of the 1960s, the Canadian Amateur Hockey Association (CAHA) felt their amateur players could no longer be competitive against the Soviet team's full-time athletes and the other constantly improving European teams. They pushed for the ability to use players from professional leagues but met opposition from the IIHF and IOC. At the IIHF Congress in 1969, the IIHF decided to allow Canada to use nine non-NHL professional hockey players at the 1970 World Championships in Montreal and Winnipeg, Manitoba, Canada. The decision was reversed in January 1970 after Brundage said that ice hockey's status as an Olympic sport would be in jeopardy if the change was made. In response, Canada withdrew from international ice hockey competition and officials stated that they would not return until "open competition" was instituted.

Beginning in the 1970s, amateurism requirements were gradually phased out of the Olympic Charter. After the 1988 Games, the IOC decided to make all professional athletes eligible for the Olympics, subject to the approval of the IFs.

Bid controversies

1976 Winter Olympics (Denver, Colorado) 

The Games were originally awarded to Denver on 12 May 1970, but a rise in costs led to Colorado voters' rejection on 7 November 1972, by a 3 to 2 margin, of a $5 million bond issue to finance the Games with public funds.

Denver officially withdrew on 15 November, and the IOC then offered the Games to Whistler, British Columbia, Canada, but they too declined, owing to a change of government following elections. Whistler would go on to be associated with neighbouring Vancouver's successful bid for the 2010 Games.

Salt Lake City, Utah, a 1972 Winter Olympics final candidate who would eventually host the 2002 Winter Olympics, offered itself as a potential host after the withdrawal of Denver. The IOC, still reeling from the Denver rejection, declined the offer from Salt Lake City and, on 5 February 1973, selected Innsbruck to host the 1976 Winter Olympics, the same city that had hosted the Games twelve years earlier.

Bidding process for the 2002 Winter Olympics 

A scandal broke on 10 December 1998, when Swiss IOC member Marc Hodler, head of the coordination committee overseeing the organisation of the 2002 Games, announced that several members of the IOC had received gifts from members of the Salt Lake City 2002 bid Committee in exchange for votes for the bid who ended as eventual winner. Soon four independent investigations were underway: by the IOC, the United States Olympic Committee (USOC), the SLOC, and the United States Department of Justice. Before any of the investigations could get under way, Tom Welch and David Johnson, the co-heads of the SLOC, both resigned their posts. Many others soon followed. The Department of Justice filed charges against the two: fifteen counts of bribery and fraud.

As a result of the investigation, ten members of the IOC were expelled and another ten were sanctioned. Stricter rules were adopted for future bids, and caps were put into place as to how much IOC members could accept from bid cities. Additionally, new term and age limits were put into place for IOC membership and an Athlete's Commission was created and fifteen former Olympic athletes gained provisional membership status.

2016 and 2020 Summer Olympics  
On 1 March 2016, Owen Gibson of The Guardian reported that French financial prosecutors investigating corruption in world athletics had expanded their remit to include the bidding and voting processes for the 2016 Summer Olympics and 2020 Summer Olympics. The story followed an earlier report in January by Gibson, who revealed that Papa Massata Diack, the son of the then-IAAF president Lamine Diack, appeared to arrange for "parcels" to be delivered to six IOC members in 2008 when Qatar was bidding for the 2016 Summer Olympic Games, though it failed to make it beyond the shortlisting stage. Due to some technical questions. Some weeks after Qatari authorities denied the allegations. Gibson then reported on 11 May 2016 that a €1.3m (£1m, $1.5m) payment from the Tokyo Olympic Committee team to an account linked to Papa Diack was made during Japan's successful race to host the 2020 Summer Games. The following day, French financial prosecutors confirmed they were investigating allegations of "corruption and money laundering" of more than $2m in suspicious payments made by the Tokyo 2020 Olympic bid committee to a secret bank account linked to Papa Diack. The string of exclusives by The Guardian prompted a response from Tsunekazu Takeda of the Tokyo 2020 bid committee on 17 May 2016, though he denied any allegations of wrongdoing, and refused to reveal details of the transfers. The controversy was reignited on 11 January 2019 after it emerged Takeda had been indicted on corruption charges in France over his role in the bid process.

2022 Winter Olympics bid scandal in Norway 

In 2014, at the final stages of the bid process, the Norwegian capital Oslo, which was seen by the specialists as the big favourite, ended up in a surprise withdrawal from its bid for the 2022 Winter Olympic and Paralympic Games. Following a string of local controversies over the event's masterplan, local officials were outraged by the demands made by the International Olympic Committee on athletes and the Olympic family. In addition, there were allegations about the expensive and lavish treatment of stakeholders, which included separate lanes to "be created on all roads where IOC members will travel, which are not to be used by regular people or public transportation", exclusive cars and drivers for all IOC members and adjusted traffic lights. The differentiated treatment by the sponsors also irritated the Norwegians, since it is common for the sponsors to deliver gifts such as exclusive electronic devices made by them. Another thing was the necessity for the import of seasonal fruits to be served at all venues and inside the Olympic Village and the need for urban equipment and furniture with the visual identity of the Games and of course the exclusivity of some other sponsors about other durable and non-durable consumer goods and also the requirements about food that will be sold during the Games at the venues. The IOC also demanded "control over all advertising space throughout Oslo and the subsites during the Games, to be used exclusively by official sponsors." This left Almaty, Kazakhstan and the eventual winner Beijing, China as the remaining two cities seeking to host the Games.

Sex verification controversies 
Sex verification is a practice used by the IOC and other sporting institutions to ensure participants compete only in categories for their sex. Verifying the sex of Olympic participants dates back to ancient Greece when Kallipateira attempted to break Greek law by dressing as a man to enter the arena as a trainer. After she was discovered a new policy was erected wherein trainers, just as athletes, were made to attend naked in order to better assure all were male. In more recent history, sex verification has taken many forms and been subject to dispute within various societal spheres. Before mandatory sex testing, Olympic officials relied on “nude parades” and doctor's notes. Successful women athletes perceived to be masculine were most likely to be targeted for inspection. In 1966, the International Olympic Committee (IOC) implemented compulsory sex verification process that was started at the 1968 Winter Olympics where a lottery system was used to determine who would be inspected with a Barr body test. The scientific community also found fault in this policy for different reasons. The use of the Barr body test was evaluated by fifteen geneticists who unanimously agreed it was scientifically invalid. By the 1970s this method was replaced with PCR testing, as well as evaluating other factors including brain anatomy and behaviour in order to verify sex. Following continued backlash against mandatory sex testing of both forms, the IOC's Athletes' Commission successfully advocated for the end of the practice in 1999. Although sex testing was no longer mandated by IOC policy, women who did not present as feminine enough continued to be inspected based on suspicion and started at 2000 Summer Olympics and  remained in use until the 2010 Winter Olympics. By 2011 the IOC created a Hyperandrogenism Regulation, which aimed to standardize natural testosterone levels in women athletes. This transition in sex testing was to assure a fairness within female categories. This was due to the belief that higher testosterone levels increased athletic ability and gave unfair advantages to certain women including intersex and transgender competitors. Any female athlete flagged for suspicion and whose testosterone surpassed regulation levels, was prohibited from competing until medical treatment brought their hormone levels within the standardized amounts. It has been argued by press, scholars, and politicians that some ethnicities are disproportionately impacted by this regulation and it has been alleged  that the rule endorses hegemonic gender norms. Most notable cases of competition bans due to sex testing results are as follows: Maria José Martínez-Patiño (1985), Santhi Soundarajan (2006), Caster Semenya (2009), Annet Negesa (2012), and Dutee Chand (2014).

Some days before the 2014 Asian Games, Indian athlete Dutee Chand was banned from competing internationally after being found to be in violation of the Hyperandrogenism Regulation. Following the decision of her appeal by the Court of Arbitration for Sport, the IOC suspended the policy for the 2016 Summer Olympics and 2018 Winter Olympics. Press advocated for the continued suspension of sex verification practices for the 2020 Summer Olympics.

Recent controversies: 2006–present

Nagano 1998 and the Olympic Family hospitality
Eight years after the 1998 Winter Olympics, a report ordered by the Nagano region's governor said the Japanese city provided millions of dollars in an "illegitimate and excessive level of hospitality" to IOC members, including US$4.4 million spent on entertainment alone. Earlier reports put the figure at approximately US$14 million. The precise figures are unknown since Nagano, after the IOC asked that the entertainment expenditures not be made public as they  destroyed the financial records.

2008 Summer Olympic Games bidding process
In 2000, international human rights groups attempted to pressure the IOC to reject Beijing's bid in protest of the state of human rights in the People's Republic of China. One Chinese dissident who expressed similar sentiments was arrested and sentenced to two years in prison for calling on the IOC to do just that at the same time that IOC inspectors were touring the city. After the city won the rights to host the 2008 Summer Olympic Games in 2001, groups like the Amnesty International expressed concerns regarding the fact that the country was to host the Olympic Games to likewise expressing concerns over the human rights situation. The second principle in the Fundamental Principles of Olympism, Olympic Charter states that "The goal of Olympism is to place sport at the service of the harmonious development of man, with a view to promoting a peaceful society concerned with the preservation of human dignity." Amnesty International considers the policies and practices of the People's Republic of China as failing to meet that principle, and urged the IOC to press the country authorities to immediately enact human rights reforms.

Some days before the Opening Ceremonies, in August 2008, the IOC issued DMCA take down notices on Tibetan Protests videos on YouTube. YouTube and the Electronic Frontier Foundation (EFF) both pushed back against the IOC, which then withdrew their complaint.

2010 Shame On You Awards
In 2010, the IOC was nominated for the Public Eye Awards. This award seeks to present "shame-on-you-awards to the nastiest corporate players of the year".

London 2012 and the Munich massacre
Before the start of the 2012 Summer Olympic Games, the IOC decided not to hold a minute of silence to honour the 11 Israeli Olympians who were killed 40 years prior in the Munich massacre. Jacques Rogge, the then-IOC President, said it would be "inappropriate" to do so. Speaking of the decision, Israeli Olympian Shaul Ladany, who had survived the Munich Massacre, commented: "I do not understand. I do not understand, and I do not accept it".

Possible removal of wrestling from the Olympic program
In February 2013, the IOC did not include wrestling as one of its core Olympic sports for the Summer Olympic programme for the 2020 Summer Olympics, after an Olympic Program revision and also the fact that there were political interferences in the International Federation and that the sport did not fit into the concept of equal opportunities for men and women.  This decision was poorly received by the sporting and community as the sport was present at all Summer Games editions. This decision was later overturned, after a  reassessment process was carried out and its permanence was maintained. Later, the sport was named among the core Olympic sports, the status it will hold until at least the 2032 Summer Olympics.

Russian doping scandal

Media attention began growing in December 2014 when German broadcaster ARD reported on state-sponsored doping in Russia, comparing it to doping in East Germany. In November 2015, the World Anti-Doping Agency (WADA) published a report and the International Association of Athletics Federations (IAAF) suspended Russia indefinitely from world track and field events. The United Kingdom Anti-Doping agency later assisted WADA with testing in Russia. In June 2016, they reported that they were unable to fully carry out their work and noted intimidation by armed Federal Security Service (FSB) agents.
After a Russian former lab director made allegations about the 2014 Winter Olympics in Sochi, WADA commissioned an independent investigation led by Richard McLaren. McLaren's investigation found corroborating evidence, concluding in a report published in July 2016 that the Ministry of Sport and the FSB had operated a "state-directed failsafe system" using a "disappearing positive [test] methodology" (DPM) from "at least late 2011 to August 2015".

In response to these findings, WADA announced that RUSADA should be regarded as non-compliant with respect to the World Anti-Doping Code and recommended that Russia be banned from competing at the 2016 Summer Olympics. The IOC rejected the recommendation, stating that a separate decision would be made for each athlete by the relevant IF and the IOC, based on the athlete's individual circumstances. One day prior to the opening ceremony, 270 athletes were cleared to compete under the Russian flag, while 167 were removed because of doping. In contrast, the entire Kuwaiti team was banned from competing under their own flag (for a non-doping related matter).

The IOC's decision on 24 July 2016 was criticised by athletes and writers. It received support from the European Olympic Committees, which said that Russia was "a valued member". Cam Cole of Canada's National Post said that the IOC had "caved, as it always does, defaulting to whatever compromise it could safely adopt without offending a superpower." Expressing disappointment, a member of the IOC Athletes' Commission, Hayley Wickenheiser, wrote, "I ask myself if we were not dealing with Russia would this decision to ban a nation [have] been an easier one? I fear the answer is yes." Writing for Deutsche Welle in Germany, Olivia Grettenberger said that Bach had "flunked" his first serious test, adding, "With this decision, the credibility of the organization is shattered once more, while that of state-sponsored doping actually receives a minor boost." Bild (Germany) described Bach as "Putin's poodle". Paul Hayward, chief sports writer of The Daily Telegraph (UK), remarked, "The white flag of capitulation flies over the International Olympic Committee. Russia's deep political reach should have told us this would happen."

Leaders of thirteen national anti-doping organisations wrote that the IOC had "violated the athletes' fundamental rights to participate in Games that meet the stringent requirements of the World Anti-Doping Code" and "[demonstrated that] it lacks the independence required to keep commercial and political interests from influencing the tough decisions necessary to protect clean sport." WADA's former chief investigation, Jack Robertson, said "The anti-doping code is now just suggestions to follow or not" and that "WADA handed the IOC that excuse [not enough time before the Olympics] by sitting on the allegations for close to a year." McLaren was dissatisfied with the IOC's handling of his report, saying "It was about state-sponsored doping and the mis-recording of doping results and they turned the focus into individual athletes and whether they should compete. [...] it was a complete turning upside down of what was in the report and passing over responsibility to all the different international federations."

In contrast to the IOC, the IPC voted unanimously to ban the entire Russian team from the 2016 Summer Paralympics, having found evidence that the DPM was also in operation at the 2014 Winter Paralympics.

On 5 December 2017, the IOC announced that the Russian Olympic Committee had been suspended effective immediately from the 2018 Winter Olympics. Athletes who had no previous drug violations and a consistent history of drug testing were to be allowed to compete under the Olympic Flag as an "Olympic Athlete from Russia" (OAR). Under the terms of the decree, Russian government officials were barred from the Games, and neither the country's flag nor anthem would be present. The Olympic Flag and Olympic Anthem will be used instead, and on 20 December 2017 the IOC proposed an alternate logo for the uniforms. IOC President Thomas Bach said that "after following due process [the IOC] has issued proportional sanctions for this systematic manipulation while protecting the clean athletes." The New York Times' Rebecca Ruiz and Tariq Panja reported the decision was "without precedent in Olympics history", while Sean Ingle at The Guardian noted the IOC's view that Russian doping was an "unprecedented attack on the integrity of the Olympic Games and sport". Hugo Lowell at the i newspaper, meanwhile, reported that the IOC nonetheless stopped short of a total ban against Russia from the Games.

On 1 February 2018, the Court of Arbitration for Sport (CAS) found that the IOC provided insufficient evidence for 28 athletes, and overturned their IOC sanctions. For 11 other athletes, the CAS decided that there was sufficient evidence to uphold their Sochi sanctions, but reduced their lifetime bans to only the 2018 Winter Olympics. The IOC said in a statement that "the result of the CAS decision does not mean that athletes from the group of 28 will be invited to the Games. Not being sanctioned does not automatically confer the privilege of an invitation" and that "this [case] may have a serious impact on the future fight against doping". The IOC found it important to note that the CAS Secretary General "insisted that the CAS decision does not mean that these 28 athletes are innocent" and that they would consider an appeal against the court's decision. Later that month, the Russian Olympic Committee was reinstated by the IOC, despite numerous failed drug tests by Russian athletes in the 2018 Olympics, and the Russian Anti-Doping Agency was re-certified in September, despite the Russian officials not accepting the McLaren Report.

The IOC was harshly criticized for their handling of the Russian doping scandal. After reinstating the Russian Olympic committee following the 2018 Winter Olympics, Jim Walden, attorney for Dr. Grigory Rodchenkov, who masterminded Russia's programme, called the move "weakness in the face of evil."

2018 plebiscite in Taiwan 
On 24 November 2018, the Taiwanese government held a referendum over a change in the naming of their National Olympic Committee, from "Chinese Taipei," a name agreed to in 1981 by the People's Republic of China at the Nagoya Protocol, who denies the ROC's legitimacy, to simply "Taiwan", after the main island in the Free Area. In the immediate days prior to the referendum, the IOC and the PRC government, issued a threatening statement, suggesting that if the team underwent the name change, the IOC had the legal right to exercise, to make a "suspension of or forced withdrawal," of the team from the 2020 Summer Olympics. In response to the allegations of election interference, the IOC stated, "The IOC does not interfere with local procedures and fully respects freedom of expression. However, to avoid any unnecessary expectations or speculations, the IOC wishes to reiterate that this matter is under its jurisdiction." Subsequently, with a significant PRC pressure, the referendum failed in Taiwan with 45.20% to 54.80%.

2022 Winter Olympic Games bidding process

As it happened 14 years earlier, the entity came under pressure again when accepting the Chinese capital's candidacy for the 2022 Winter Olympic and Paralympic Games. Starting in 2014, numerous human rights groups and governments criticised the committee for allowing Beijing to bid for the 2022 Winter Olympics which eventually the city won. Some weeks before the Opening Ceremonies at the wake of the release of the Xinjiang Papers, which documented the abuses by the Chinese government against the Uyghur population in Xinjiang, in what many governments have described as a genocide. Many government officials, notably those in the United States and the Great Britain, called for a boycott of the 2022 winter games. The IOC responded to concerns by saying that the Olympic Games must not be politicized. Some Nations, including the United States, diplomatically boycotted games, which prohibited a diplomatic delegation from representing a nation at the games, rather than a full boycott which would have also barred athletes from competing. In September 2021, the IOC suspended the North Korea National Olympic Committee, after they boycott the 2020 Summer Olympics claiming "COVID-19 Concerns". Many journalists and specialists have speculated that this suspension was intended to send a message to other nations, that if they boycott the 2022 Winter Olympic Games, they could be suspended from participation in future editions.

On 14 October 2021, vice-president of the IOC, John Coates, announced that the IOC had no plans to challenge the Chinese government on humanitarian issues, stating that the issues were "not within the IOC's remit".

In December 2021, the United States House of Representatives voted unanimously for a resolution stating that the IOC had violated its own human rights commitments by cooperating with the Chinese government. In January 2022, members of the U.S. House of Representatives unsuccessfully attempted to pass legislation to strip the IOC of its tax exemption status in the United States.

Peng Shuai forced disappearance
In November 2021, the IOC was again criticized by Human Rights Watch (HRW) and others for its response to the 2021 disappearance of Peng Shuai, following her publishing of sexual assault allegations against former Chinese vice premier, and high-ranking member of the Chinese Communist Party, Zhang Gaoli.
The IOC's response was internationally criticized as complicit in assisting the Chinese government to silence Peng's sexual assault allegations. Zhang Gaoli previously led the Beijing bidding committee to host the 2022 Winter Olympics.

Current IOC Executive Board

IOC Commissions

The Olympic Partner programme

The Olympic Partner (TOP) sponsorship programme includes the following commercial sponsors of the Olympic Games. 
Airbnb
Allianz
Alibaba Group
Atos
Bridgestone
Coca-Cola
Intel
Mengniu Dairy (joint partnership with Coca-Cola)
Omega SA (previously The Swatch Group, its parent company)
Panasonic
Procter & Gamble
Samsung
Toyota
Visa Inc.

See also

Association of International Olympic Winter Sports Federations (AIOWF)
Association of IOC Recognised International Sports Federations (ARISF)
Association of Summer Olympic International Federations (ASOIF)
International Academy of Sport Science and Technology (AISTS)
International Committee of Sports for the Deaf (ICSD)
International Paralympic Committee (IPC)
International University Sports Federation (FISU)
Global Association of International Sports Federations (GAISF)
FICTS (Fédération Internationale Cinéma Télévision Sportifs) (Organisation recognised by the IOC)
 List of IOC meetings
 Olympic Congress

References

Further reading

 
1894 establishments in Switzerland
International sports bodies based in Switzerland
Sports organizations established in 1894
United Nations General Assembly observers

Olympic organizations
Supraorganizations
Organisations based in Lausanne